Karagiozis or Karaghiozis is a shadow puppet and fictional character of Greek folklore, originating in the Turkish shadow play Karagöz and Hacivat. He is the main character of the tales narrated in the Turkish and Greek shadow-puppet theatre.

Origins

Some believe that it originates from the island of Java where shadow puppet shows (wayang kulit) were played already as early as in the 11th century and arrived in the Ottoman Empire via traders. The first Karagöz–Hacivat play was performed for Sultan Selim I (reigned 1512–1520) in Egypt after his conquest of the country in 1517, but 17th century writer Evliya Çelebi stated that it had been performed in the Ottoman palace as early as the reign of Bayezid I (reigned 1389–1402). In the 16th century, Ottoman Grand Mufti Muhammad Ebussuud el-İmadi issued a celebrated opinion allowing the performance of Karagöz plays.

Shadow theatre, with a single puppeteer creating voices for a dialogue, narrating a story, and possibly even singing while manipulating puppets, appears to come ultimately from the Indonesian wayang kulit or Chinese pi ying xi Shadow play.

The name Karagiozis or Karaghiozis is from Greek Καραγκιόζης, borrowed from Turkish Karagöz 'dark eye'.

There are several stories of how shadow theater was established in Asia Minor. Many argue for a Mediterranean origin in the Egyptian shadow puppet tradition.  Whatever the case, it is worthwhile to mention that regardless of religious restrictions, shadow theater became more widespread around the 16th century among the Muslim Turks.

Originally, his popular appeal was his scatological language and protruding phallus. It is still performed in Turkey, especially during Ramadan celebrations, under the same name. 

Karagiozis seems to have come to mainland Greece, probably from Asia Minor (Anatolia) at the 19th century, during Ottoman rule. Karagiozis was hellenized in Patras, Greece in the end of 19th century by Dimitrios Sardounis, a.k.a.  Mimaros,  regarded as the founder of modern Greek shadow theater.

The genre became a fully integrated, though adapted, amongst the Greek population. But there are several legends as well as studies surrounding Karagiozis's arrival and subsequent popularity in Greece.  Some stories say that Greek merchants brought the art from China and others say that it was a Greek who created the "legend" during Ottoman rule for the entertainment of the sultan.  Yet others believe that it originated from real events involving two masonry workers named Karagöz and Haci Ivat working in the construction of a mosque in the city of Bursa, Turkey in early 14th century.

Setting
Karagiozis is a poor hunchbacked Greek, his right hand is always depicted long, his clothes are ragged and patched, and his feet are always bare. He lives in a poor cottage (Greek: παράγκα) with his wife Aglaia and his three sons, during the times of the Ottoman Empire. The scene is occupied by his cottage on the left, and the Sultan's Palace (Saray (building)) on the far right. 

Because of his poverty, Karagiozis uses mischievous and crude ways to  get money and feed his family.

Students of folklore divide Karagiozis' tales in two major categories: the 'Heroics' and the 'Comedies'. The Heroics are tales based on tradition or real stories involving the times under Ottoman rule, and Karagiozis is presented as a helper and assistant of an important hero.

Puppeteers devise their own original tales; however there are many 'traditional' tales  passed on orally from earlier puppeteers and are accepted as 'canon' with slight alterations  among  players. Most of them are formulaic and have the following layout, albeit  with a wide improvisational variety, and often involve interaction with the audience:

Karagiozis appears in the scene with his three sons dancing and singing. He welcomes the audience and holds a comical dialogue with his children. He then announces the title of the episode and enters his cottage
The Vizier or a local Ottoman lord meets Hadjiavatis and reports that he has a problem and needs someone to perform a deed
Hadjiavatis obeys and starts announcing the news (usually a singing sequence) until Karagiozis hears about it
Initially annoyed by Hadjiavatis' shouting, he finds it's an opportunity to gain money (either by helping the Vizier or not) and sometimes asks Hadjiavatis to aid him.
Karagiozis either attempts to help the Vizier or fool him. The regular characters (see below) appear one at a time in the scene (they often appear with an introducing song which is standard for each of them); Karagiozis has a funny dialogue with them, mocks them, fools them, or becomes annoyed and ousts them violently.
Finally, Karagiozis is either rewarded by the Vizier or his mischief is revealed and he's punished - usually by the Vizier's bodyguard, Veligekas.
At the end Hadjiavatis appears on the screen and, together with Karagiozis, they announce the end of the show.

Some of the best known tales include
Alexander the Great and the accursed snake
Karagiozis the doctor
Karagiozis the cook
Karagiozis the senator
Karagiozis the scholar
Karagiozis the fisherman
Karagiozis and the gorilla
Karagiozis and the ghost

The characters 

Karagiozis (Καραγκιόζης), is a trickster poor Greek man whose sole interest is sleep and eating. Socially, he is in closer relation to Hadji Ivat (Greek: Hadjiavatis) than any other characters, and often he is informed by him, sometimes they cooperate in business, but sometimes Hadjiavatis is a victim of Karagiozis' tricks.
Kollitiria (Κολλητήρια), Karagiozis' three kids. Some versions give their names as (from older and taller to younger and shorter) Kollitiris, Svouras and Mirigkokos.
Aglaia, (Αγλαΐα) Karagiozis' wife, who is usually unseen but whose characteristically nagging voice is heard to be coming from inside Karagiozis's house.
Hadjiavatis (Χατζηαβάτης), (the Turkish counterpart is Hacivat) he is Karagiozis' friend and sidekick, an honest and serious figure but often ends up being wrapped up in Karagiozis' schemes. He has a tendency to flatter the powerful and is sometimes depicted as a compliant person towards the occupying and dominant establishment, contrasting Karagiozis.
Barba Yorgos (Μπάρμπα Γιώργος, "Uncle George"), he represents a  rustic from the mountains of  Rumeli, depicted as a shepherd or dairy farmer, usually on some business related to visiting  the lowlands;  he is sturdily built  and wears  the traditional fustanella kilted outfit. Even though he  understands his nephew to be a crook, he helps him out and beats all the opponents black and blue with his staff.
Stavrakas (Σταύρακας), whose puppet is the only one with a long independent arm, like Karagiozis. He represents the "mangas" culture prevalent in Piraeus and the Rebetiko tradition. Although trying to bully the others, Karagiozis usually teases him.
Sior Dionysios (Σιορ Διονύσιος), an Italianate gentleman from Zakynthos pretending to be of  noble stock. Faithful to his Ionian Islands origin, he sings cantades and speaks the Ionian Greek dialect with the  telltale accent.
Morfonios (Μορφονιός), a vain westernized dandy; however, he is  ugly with a huge head with a very large nose; still, he considers himself to be handsome and keeps falling in love. He often exclaims a sound like "whit!"
Solomon (Σολομών), a usually rich Jew from Thessaloniki, one of the less known characters, he speaks in his own fashion, sometimes uttering a very fast repeating sound often compared to a Gatling gun, earning him, by Karagiozis, the nickname "heavy arms", despite his frail build. His personality can vary, but usually plays minor roles.
Vizier (Βεζύρης), also called Pasha (Πασάς) in some versions, he is the dominant figure of the occupying side and lives in the Saray. He is usually the beginning of each new tale, by announcing trials, deeds, tests etc. to which Karagiozis usually decides to become involved.
Fatme (Φατμέ) is the Vizier or Pasha's beautiful daughter  playing either obedient or rebellious roles; she has more than one way of causing trouble, sometimes for good purposes, in opposition to  her despotic father; or, in mischief,   out of  dislike for Karagiozis or some other hero.
Veligekas (Βελιγκέκας), an Albanian guard of the Saray. He is the executive arm of the Pasha, always on the lookout for Karagiozis and never wastes an opportunity to give him a good beating. Usually, however,  he gets beaten by Barba Yorgos.
Peponias (Πεπόνιας), a fat officer of the Saray,  replacing Veligekas in some versions.

Some players have further introduced  more characters,  such as Karagiozis' old father, or Stavrakas' friend, Nondas.

The puppets 
All the figures that represent the characters of the shows are two dimensional and designed always in profile. They were traditionally made from camel skin, carved to allow light through the image, creating details, but are today most often made of cardboard. Traditional puppets gave off black shadows against the white screen, but some more recent puppets have holes covered with colored silk or plastic gel materials to create colored shadows.  The torso, waist, feet and sometimes the limbs, were separate pieces that were joined together with pins. Most figures were composed of two parts (torso and legs) with only one joint to the waist. Two characters, the Jew and Morfonios had joints in the neck, and had a flexible head.
They were moved with a stick attached to their 'back', except in the case of the figure of Karagiozis, Stavrakas and a few other characters whose arms or other limbs required separate movement. The 'scene' was a vertical white parapet, usually a cloth, called mperntes (from Turk. 'perde', curtain). Between the figures and the player (who was invisible), were candles or lamps that shed light to the figures and made their silhouettes and colours visible to the audience through the cloth.

Modern incarnations 

Conrad, also known as Karaghiosis, the protagonist of Roger Zelazny's ...And Call Me Conrad (also known as This Immortal), which won the 1966 Hugo Award for Best Novel, is partially inspired by this character.

In Greek daily speech, the name Karagiozis is also used as an insult more or less like clown. Puppeteers complain about this, saying that while Karagiozis can be violent, mischievous, a liar and an anti-hero, he is also good-natured and faithful, so his name should not be used as an insult.

During the 1980s, Greek Television had Karagiozis shows on a weekly basis. These shows had more modern and educational themes, like for example Karagiozis living some myths of Greek mythology or visiting the moon and other planets. Some of these episodes were either live with an audience, or filmed especially for the TV show and contained scenes that required editing or special effects.

There have been several recent attempts to make Karagiozis incarnations in comic books. Since the 2000s, Karagiozis is not so popular as a choice of recreation for young kids and the number of puppeteers has diminished, but remains a significant and well known folkloric figure. Today, he is performed mostly in folk feasts or festivals and on national Greek television. There are also occasional tours in the Greek diaspora.

See also 
Karagöz and Hacivat, the Turkish analog
Punch and Judy, an English puppet show
Spathario Museum, museum dedicated to Karagiozis named after Eugenios Spatharis.

References

Further reading

External links

 Greek Shadow Theater by Giannis Chatzis - Greek Shadow Theater of Giannis Chatzis.
 Greek Shadow Theater of Tasos Andriotis - Info of shadow theater, figures etc.
 Greek Shadows: A new, comprehensive website dedicated to Shadow Theatre All you need to know about Greek shadow theatre. By Dorina Papaliou
 Greek Theatre of Shadows: Panos Kapetanidis Greek Theatre of Shadows, Panos Kapetanidis
 Greek Shadow Theater: Group Athanasiou Greek Shadow Theater Group of Practitioners, Mosxato, Athens
Spathario Museum Museum of Shadow Theatre, Maroussi, Athens
The Shadow Theatre of Kostas Makris Greek Shadow Theatre puppeteer
"The magic of traditional Greek shadow theatre" Extensive article about Karaghiozis
Cooperative site of puppeteers
The Karagiozis Puppet Theatre
 Under Development game with Karaghiozis
Museum in Turkish Bursa on the subject

Fictional characters introduced in the 19th century
Fictional Greek people
History of theatre
Puppets
Greek folklore
Turkish folklore
Culture in Patras
Shadow play
Fictional hunchbacks
Ottoman Empire in fiction
Fictional tricksters